Justus Goebel, Sr.  (July 21, 1858 – March 11, 1919) of Covington, Kentucky was a Kentucky delegate to the 1912 Democratic National Convention and a tax-reform advocate. He was president of Lowry & Goebel.

Biography
He was born on July 21, 1858 in Carbondale, Pennsylvania to Wilhelm Goebel and Augusta Groenkle. He had brothers William J. Goebel and Arthur Goebel and sister Minnie Goebel Braunecker.

He married Elizabeth Reynolds and they had three children, Lieutenant Justus Goebel II (1892–1957); Captain William Arthur Goebel (born 1887 ), who both served in the American Expeditionary Forces; and Lilie Goebel Heusch, of Columbus, Ohio.

Career
Goebel was a co-owner of the Lowry & Goebel carpet company.

A tax attorney, he was an advocate of tax reform in Kentucky and advocated for reevaluation of corporate assets. In a speech after his brother's assassination in 1900, Gobel accused corporate interests of being behind the crime and demanded that "The guilty in high places be uncovered, and justice be done to them."

His brother died in 1900, and in 1901 Goebel was indicted for bribery. In 1910 he moved to near Phoenix, Arizona for health reasons.

He was a delegate to the 1912 Democratic National Convention from Kentucky. He died on March 11, 1919, in Cincinnati, Ohio of the Spanish flu. Goebel was buried at Highland Cemetery in Covington.

References

External links

1857 births
1919 deaths
People from Covington, Kentucky
Lawyers from Phoenix, Arizona
Kentucky Democrats
19th-century American lawyers
Deaths from the Spanish flu pandemic in the United States
Deaths from the Spanish flu pandemic in Ohio